The Little Shepherd of Kingdom Come is a lost 1920 silent film drama directed by Wallace Worsley and starring Jack Pickford. It was produced and distributed by Goldwyn Pictures.

Cast
Jack Pickford - Chad
Clara Horton - Margaret
Pauline Starke - Melissa
J. Parks Jones - Dan Dean
Clark Marshall - Harry Dean
Edythe Chapman - Mrs. Dean
James Neill - Major Buford
R. D. MacLean - General (*as R.D. McLean)
T. D. Crittenden - Schoolmaster (as Dwight Crittenden)
Aileen Manning - Cousin Lucy
Dudley Hendricks - Joel Turner
Aggie Herring - Mrs. Turner
Tod Burns - Turner Boy
Lee Phelps - Turner Boy
Milton Brown - Pop Dillon

References

External links

The Little Shepherd of Kingdom Come at IMDb.com

Media (archived)

1920 films
American silent feature films
Lost American films
Films directed by Wallace Worsley
Goldwyn Pictures films
American black-and-white films
Silent American drama films
1920 drama films
Films based on American novels
1920 lost films
Lost drama films
1920s American films